The Pennsylvania Department of Transportation (PennDOT) is responsible for the establishment and classification of a state highway network which includes Interstate Highways, U.S. Highways, and state routes. U.S. and Interstate highways are classified as state routes in Pennsylvania. The Commonwealth of Pennsylvania established the Location Referencing System (LRS) in 1987, which registers all numbered routes in Pennsylvania as SR-X. A state route would be SR 39, a US Route would be SR 22, and an Interstate route would be SR 80. However, routes which are numbered between 0000 and 0999 are classified as Traffic Routes, which are abbreviated as PA 39, US 22, and I-80, instead. There are also four-digit numbers for various "state roads" over which PennDOT has jurisdiction, but those numbers are not displayed on the roads, except in rural areas, where they are posted with index-card-sized small signs. In urban areas, these numbers are somewhat less prominently posted, and these streets are known by the names on the street signs.

History
In 1911, when the Sproul Road Bill was passed, a large number of Legislative Routes (LR) were assigned. These were the primary internal numbering until the present Location Referencing System was adopted in 1987. See also List of legislative routes in Pennsylvania.

Signed Traffic Route numbers from 1 to 12 were first assigned in 1924 to several of the national auto trails:

Italics denote former routes.

 Pennsylvania Route 1: Lincoln Highway
 Pennsylvania Route 2: Lackawanna Trail
 Pennsylvania Route 3: William Penn Highway
 Pennsylvania Route 4: Susquehanna Trail
 Pennsylvania Route 5: Lakes-to-Sea Highway
 Pennsylvania Route 6: Old Monument Trail (after 1924)
 Pennsylvania Route 7: Roosevelt Highway
 Pennsylvania Route 8: William Flinn Highway (after 1924)
 Pennsylvania Route 9: Yellowstone Trail, Chicago-Buffalo Highway
 Pennsylvania Route 10: Buffalo-Pittsburgh Highway (1927)
 Pennsylvania Route 11: National Pike, National Old Trails Road
 Pennsylvania Route 12: Baltimore Pike
 Pennsylvania Route 13: Chambersburg, Pennsylvania - Philadelphia, Pennsylvania (after 1924)
 Pennsylvania Route 14: York Trail (1927)
 Pennsylvania Route 17: Benjamin Franklin Highway (1927)
 Pennsylvania Route 18: Erie-Lincoln Highway (1927)
 Pennsylvania Route 19: Lewistown - Scranton, Anthracite Trail (after 1924)
 Pennsylvania Route 22: Keystone Trail (1927)
 Pennsylvania Route 24: Washington-Harrisburg Route (after 1924)
 Pennsylvania Route 33: Lykens Valley Trail (1927)
 Pennsylvania Route 41: Reading - Harrisburg (after 1924)
 Pennsylvania Route 44: Highway to the Stars (Potter County)
 Pennsylvania Route 46: Bradford Farmers' Valley Highway (1927)
 Pennsylvania Route 55: Bucktail Trail (1927)
 Pennsylvania Route 64: Horseshoe Trail, Altoona-Bellefonte-Cumberland Trail (1927)
 Pennsylvania Route 66: Anchor Line
 Pennsylvania Route 88: Perry Highway (1927)

Soon more numbers were assigned, including three-digit numbers for branches, like Pennsylvania Route 272 from Pennsylvania Route 72. The United States Numbered Highways were assigned in late 1926, and in 1928 State Routes concurrent with U.S. Routes were removed, while those that conflicted with U.S. Routes were assigned new numbers. In 1946, a mass decommissioning of highways around the state occurred, and many state routes were decommissioned, truncated, or rerouted. The establishment of the Interstate Highway System in 1959, as well as wanting to eliminate some concurrences in Pittsburgh, resulted in a small renumbering in 1961.

Since Pennsylvania first introduced numbered traffic routes in 1924, a keystone shape has been used, in reference to Pennsylvania being the "Keystone State". The signs originally said "Penna" (a common abbreviation for Pennsylvania at the time), followed by the route number in block-style numbering in a keystone cutout. In the mid 1950s, the signs were modified to have "PA" instead of "Penna", with the lone exception being the mainline Pennsylvania Turnpike (which continues to use "Penna" today for both the mainline, the Northeast Extension, and the Pennsylvania Turnpike Commission logo); additionally, the numbers were made more round and the signs were made larger in order to be more legible while driving, and the keystone shape itself remained a cutout. By the late 1960s, as U.S. Routes were beginning to be made on rectangular cutouts with the U.S.-style shield painted onto them instead of the shield cutout in most states outside of California, the same was done with the keystone. The state initials were removed altogether and while the numbers remained rounded, were standardized into FHWA Series E typeface, which was becoming the standard for the Interstate Highway System. Most of the 1950s vintage signs were replaced with the newer rectangular cutout with the painted-on keystone by the early 1970s, though a very few remain in scattered places on non-decommissioned roads. Pennsylvania has used the painted-on keystone signs since.

List of state routes

Pennsylvania routes with a different State Route number
PA 86 - assigned as SR 0886 (SR 0086 currently assigned to I-86)
PA 97 (Erie County) - assigned as SR 0019 and SR 0197 (the latter was never designated as a PA route)
PA 99 - assigned as SR 0699 (never designated as a PA route; SR 0099 currently assigned to I-99)
PA 283 - assigned as SR 0300 (SR 0283 currently assigned to I-283)
PA 380 - assigned as SR 0400 (SR 0380 currently assigned to I-380)

See also

Keystone Marker
Former state routes in Pennsylvania
New York State Route 17, which briefly dips into Pennsylvania in South Waverly, but is signed and maintained by New York

References

External links

Pennsylvania Department of Transportation
Pennsylvania Highways
The Pennsylvania State Route Numbering System
Pennsylvania Gateway @ NorthEastRoads.com
Pennsylvania State Route Ends

 List
State